is a 2002 Japanese science fiction film directed by Takashi Yamazaki and starring Anne Suzuki and Takeshi Kaneshiro.

Plot
Milly is a soldier from 2084, where humanity is on the verge of extinction because of the "Daggra", an alien race. In mankind's final stronghold in Tibet, Milly leaps into a newly built time portal just before the fortress is overrun. The portal sends her to 2002, where her mission is to kill the first Daggra, who faked a crash landing, and stop him from signaling his invasion fleet.

Milly lands in the aftermath of a shootout in Tokyo Bay, where a hitman named Miyamoto holds the murderous Triad mobster Mizoguchi  at gunpoint. Her arrival allows the mobster to escape and Miyamoto takes Milly, who he thinks he accidentally shot, back to his place. She was saved by a plate of metal in her coat. She tapes a tiny bomb to his neck and threatens him into helping her on her mission. Miyamoto has a personal score to settle with Mizoguchi, who killed his childhood friend by kidnapping him and selling off his organs.

That night, Miyamoto sees Milly cleaning up his trenchcoat on a coat hanger, so he tells her to go back to sleep. The next morning he discovers photos of himself and a newspaper article on his death. He shows these to his weapons supplier Shi, who tells him it's an elaborate trick the Triads wouldn't waste their time on.

With Shi's help, they track down where the alien spaceship crashed, but it was taken away to the National Institute of Space Science. They try to get to the spaceship to kill the alien, but Mizoguchi arrives and tries to take the facility over. Milly is surprised at the alien, it is not what she expected. She hesitates to kill it as Mizoguchi advances on the lab.

Using Miyamoto as its mouthpiece, the alien says it wants to go home. Milly realizes that she has been lied to. The humans and not the aliens, started the war which has been destroying the human race. They started it when they captured and killed the alien. She now knows they have to stop Mizoguchi as he wants the alien technology to take over the world. Following the destruction of the Space Science lab, Mizoguchi and his goons take the alien and its ship. Meanwhile, Miyamoto and Milly regroup for the next part of her mission.

The duo again confronts Mizoguchi at an abandoned oil rig, where they rescue the alien. Surviving a huge explosion, a bloodied Mizoguchi threatens to kill them all for ruining his plans. However, his bullets hit an invisible force field. Miyamoto quickly grabs the gun and kills Mizoguchi. Before they can figure out where the force field came from a Daggra craft, disguised as a Boeing 747-400 airliner arrives, having received the alien's distress signal. The Daggra take their wounded comrade and leave Earth. As the future war has ceased to exist, Milly slowly disappears.

Shortly after the incident, Miyamoto decides to give up his life of violence and hands in his guns to Shi. While walking home, he is confronted by a thug whose life he had spared earlier at Tokyo Bay. Realizing that he is weaponless, Miyamoto is helpless as the thug shoots him. The thug walks away, assuming that Miyamoto is dead. A little later, Miyamoto staggers up and finds his life was saved by a plate of metal similar to Milly's. The plate has a written message by Milly, telling him she has repaid him. Miyamoto recalls the night Milly messed around with his trenchcoat. While Miyamoto and Milly were asleep, a second, future Milly traveled from the future and slipped the metal plate into his trenchcoat before returning to her timeline. On her way out, she accidentally drops the newspaper article on Miyamoto's death.

Cast
 Takeshi Kaneshiro as Miyamoto
 Anne Suzuki as Milly
 Goro Kishitani as Mizoguchi
 Kirin Kiki as Shi Zhi Tang
 Dean Harrington as Dr. Brown

Release
Returner was released theatrically in Japan on August 31, 2002 where it was distributed by Toho. The film premiered at number one in the Japanese box office on its release, beating The Cat Returns, Star Wars: Episode II – Attack of the Clones and Resident Evil. It grossed a total of $9,564,276 in Japan.

It received a theatrical release in the United States through Destination Films and Samuel Goldwyn Films with English subtitles on October 17, 2003.

Reception
Returner has received generally negative reviews, with a 35% rating on Rotten Tomatoes. Derek Elley of Variety wrote on his review that "Kaneshiro is all long flowing locks and smoldering disdain, the visual F/X are only so-so, and pacing is almost brisk enough to hide the plot holes." Don Willmott of Filmcritic.com gave the film 2 out of 5 stars, calling it "a watchable, if somewhat absurd, sci-fi stir fry."

On the positive side, Jo Berry of Empire magazine gave the film 3 out of 5 stars, saying, "So much of this film is 'borrowed' it's like watching a chirpy tribute band. Good fun." Peter Hartlaub of the San Francisco Chronicle also offered qualified praise, pointing out that "with little room for new ideas, the film must rely on the strength of its actors, and they're excellent across the board."

References

Bibliography

External links
 
 
 
Returner at LoveHKFilm.com
 Returner at Metacritic

2002 films
2002 science fiction action films
Films directed by Takashi Yamazaki
Films set in 2002
Films set in 2084
Films about Tibet
Films set in Tokyo
2000s Japanese-language films
Japanese science fiction action films
2000s Mandarin-language films
Japanese post-apocalyptic films
Films about time travel
Triad films
Toho films
2000s English-language films
2000s Japanese films
2000s Hong Kong films